Alhaji Mohammed Dabo Lere (1940–2002) is a Nigerian politician who was elected Governor of Kaduna State, Nigeria between January 1992 and November 1993 during the Nigerian Third Republic, leaving office after the military coup that brought General Sani Abacha to power.

Dabo Lere was of Hausa-Fulani origin. He was born into the Lere royal family on March 15, 1940 in Lere town Lere Local Government Area in Kaduna State.
 
He was elected Governor of Kaduna State in December 1991 on the National Republican Convention (NRC) platform, with James Bawa Magaji as his running mate.
In February 1992 there was violence between the mainly Muslim Hausa and mainly Christian Kataf communities of the Zangon-Kataf Local Government Area, with over 60 people killed. What most people do not seem to understand about the conflict is question is that not all Hausa people are Muslims, likewise the Kataf ethnicity has a tiny fraction that belongs to the Islam. One has to be very careful before one points accusing finger on one religion regarding religious conflicts entirely in Nigeria.

Instead, the one factor to blame is nothing other than ignorance and unemployment in Nigeria.

Dabo Lere set up a 7-person judicial committee to investigate the crisis, but neither side was satisfied.
On 15 May 1992 there was a further outbreak of violence in Zangon-Kataf, and after news spread to Kaduna there was further violence in reprisal from both sides. It is embarrassing that rich people from both parties assisted their youths with weapons in order to fight the people they refer as enemies. 
Dabo Lere eventually made a broadcast at 7 p.m. on 17 May, calling for a curfew, which was ignored. 
After four days, calm returned when President Ibrahim Babangida ordered a dusk-to-dawn curfew and rushed in army troops and riot police from other states.

In 2001, Dabo Lere led the supporters of Ibrahim Babangida in the North.

Dabo Lere died of a stroke in Abuja on 18 February 2002, aged 64.

References

2002 deaths
1940 births
National Republican Convention politicians
Governors of Kaduna State